A Rock (stylized in all caps) is the debut studio album by American country music singer Hardy, released on September 4, 2020, via Big Loud Records.

Content

Joey Moi and Derek Wells produced the entire album, with co-production from David Garcia on "Where Ya At" and from Jake Mitchell on "Unapologetically Country as Hell" and the title track. The album is a followup to Hardy's EP Hixtape, Vol. 1. "One Beer", featuring Devin Dawson and Lauren Alaina, is the lead single.

Critical reception
Jeff Lincoln of Country Standard Time reviewed the album favorably, complimenting Hardy's unconventional appearance for a country musician, as well as his lyrical skill and combination of country and rock influences. He concluded his review with "it's got authentic appeal, and Hardy's found the right label at Big Loud Records. Country music was always more than the hats anyhow." Zackary Kephart of Country Universe rated the album 1 out of 5 stars, stating that "he’s a detailed writer, and that’s why, I think, most people haven’t immediately written this off as an attempt at any sort of revival of the trend itself. It’s just that his details are completely unlikable". He also criticized the mixing and production of Joey Moi and Hardy's limited vocal range.

Track listing

Notes
 All track titles are stylized in all caps.

Charts

Weekly charts

Year-end charts

Certifications

References

2020 debut albums
Hardy (singer) albums
Big Loud albums
Albums produced by Joey Moi